Out of There is a 1974 aluminum sculpture by Clement Meadmore.

Editions
There are two editions, one of which is installed outside the Columbus Museum of Art, in Columbus, Ohio, United States. The abstract artwork, painted black, is 78 inches tall and 201 inches long. It was donated to the museum by the Ashland Oil Company in 1979.

The other copy is installed along Camp Street just south of the Hale Boggs Federal Building in New Orleans, Louisiana.

See also

 1974 in art

References

1974 sculptures
Abstract sculptures in the United States
Aluminum sculptures in the United States
Columbus Museum of Art
Outdoor sculptures in Columbus, Ohio
Outdoor sculptures in Louisiana
Sculptures by Clement Meadmore